Kartal is a district of Istanbul, Turkey, located on the Asian side of the city, on the coast of the Marmara Sea between Maltepe and Pendik.

Despite being far from the city centre, Kartal is heavily populated (total population of 541,209) (2008 census). The total land area is 147,000 m2, which includes some countryside areas inland. The district's neighbours are Maltepe to the west, Sultanbeyli and Sancaktepe to the north and Pendik to the east. Inland from the coast, the land rises sharply up to the hills Yakacık and Aydos, the latter of which is the highest point in Istanbul.

History
Kartal ('eagle' in Turkish, by folk etymology) was a fishing village on the shore of the Marmara Sea during the Byzantine Empire, called Kartalimen or Kartalimin in Greek, and was founded at the beginning of the 6th century. In the 11th century, the town was conquered by the ruler of the Seljuks, Suleyman Shah. In 1329, Kartal became part of the Ottoman Empire, the Byzantines re-took the city in 1403, however, and held it for 17 years before losing it to the Ottomans again.

According to the Ottoman General Census of 1881/82-1893, the kaza of Kartal had a total population of 12.969, consisting of 6.920 Greeks, 5.095 Muslims, 869 Armenians, 3 Catholics, 1 Jew and 81 foreign citizens.

By 1947, Kartal was an industrial area and with the introduction of commuter trains to Haydarpaşa Terminal from Gebze in 1973, Kartal became even more important as an industrial area of Istanbul. However, the current trend is that factories are being closed down and moved inland. For example, the large cement factory on the shore, which is to be converted into a cultural center, was closed in 2003.

There is a historical Roman bath ruin near Dragos Hill, which is being recovered by the Istanbul Archaeology Museums, with the financial support of Kartal Municipality.

Kartal today
Luxury apartment complexes have been built on the coast, along with much more housing inland and this has attracted more shops and infrastructure.

Housing is of good-quality in general.  Building near the coast slowed after the 1999 earthquake, when people became aware that a major fault line runs just off this coast. However, building on the high ground inland is proceeding apace.

On 4 June 2007, the Greater Istanbul Municipality and the former mayor of Kartal announced that a new urban city environment would be built in Kartal-Pendik. The plan includes a central business district, luxury residential developments, cultural facilities such as concert halls, museums, and theatres, and leisure locations including a marina and tourist hotels.

Kartal is the terminal station of Kadıköy - Sabiha Gökçen Airport metro line. The Marmaray for commuter trains also passes through Kartal.

Geography
The coast of Kartal has sandy and clay soils, whereas the northern part of the district is mostly silica. On Yakacık Hill, there are limestone and quartz deposits. 

The streams of Paşaköy, Kavaklıdere and Fındıklı feed the reservoir behind the Ömerli Dam.

Climate 
Kartal experiences a Mediterranean climate (Csa/Cs) according to both Köppen and Trewartha climate classifications, with cool winters and warm to hot summers. Kartal is rain-shadowed by Yakacık and Aydos hills, and is therefore in a warmer and drier microclimate, and has the driest summers in Istanbul. As such it is frequently cited as the second warmest district of Istanbul, and also one of the few districts in Istanbul with a USDA hardiness zone rating of 9b and an AHS heat zone rating of 4.

Religion
The majority religion of today's Kartal is Islam. Kartal Cemevi is one of the several Alevi temples in Istanbul. Kartal Surp Nişan Armenian Orthodox Church (Holy Cross Armenian Church) is an Armenian Church located on the downtown of Kartal. Muhammad Maarifi Mosque which is also in Kartal features the mausoleum of the founder of the Maarifi Islamic order. There are seventy mosques within the district.

Transport
Metro
M4 Kadıköy - Sabiha Gökçen Airport metro line

Train Line
Marmaray Train Line

Ferryboats
Kartal - Princes' Islands boats

Recreation
A part of the Kartal Park was developed in July 2018 as a "mist" park" featuring articial mist, colorful light effects and classical music attracting local residents and mainly children during hot summer days.

Sister towns

  Ardino, Bulgaria
  Asparuhovo, Bulgaria
  Banovići, Bosnia and Herzegovina
  Bor, Niğde, Turkey
  Buzovna, Azerbaijan
  Gölpazarı, Bilecik, Turkey
  Çüngüş, Diyarbakır, Turkey
  Damal, Ardahan, Turkey
  Esentepe, Northern Cyprus
  Gölpazarı, Bilecik, Turkey
  Hacıbektaş, Niğde, Turkey
  İmrenler, Konya
  Ilfov, Romania
  Kemalpaşa, Artvin, Turkey
  Mudurnu, Bursa, Turkey
  Ovacık, Tunceli, Turkey
  Ömerli, Mardin, Turkey
  Pınarhisar, Kırklareli, Turkey
  Sjenica, Serbia
  Subaşı, Yalova, Turkey
  Visoko, Bosnia and Herzegovina

See also

 List of districts of Istanbul
 9 March 2004, attack on Istanbul restaurant

References

External links

 The Government Office at Kartal (in Turkish)
 Kartal Municipality

 
6th-century establishments in the Byzantine Empire
Districts of Istanbul Province
Fishing communities in Turkey
Populated places established in the 6th century
Populated places in Istanbul Province